Samba Diallo (born 5 January 2003) is a Senegalese professional footballer who plays as a left winger for Dynamo Kyiv and the Senegal U20 national football team.

Club career
Samba is a product of the local AF Darou Salam, but in July 2021 he signed a contract with Ukrainian side Dynamo Kyiv and played in the Ukrainian Premier League Reserves. 

He made his debut for Dynamo Kyiv on 28 October 2022, playing as a second-half substitute in a draw away to Cypriot club AEK Larnaca in the 2022–23 UEFA Europa League group stage.

References

External links
 
 

2003 births
Living people
Senegalese footballers
Senegal youth international footballers
Association football forwards
FC Dynamo Kyiv players
Senegalese expatriate footballers
Expatriate footballers in Ukraine
Senegalese expatriate sportspeople in Ukraine